Ampittia maroides is a species of butterfly in the family Hesperiidae. It was described by Lionel de Nicéville in 1896. It is found in Burma, Thailand and Laos.

References

Butterflies described in 1896
Ampittia
Butterflies of Asia
Taxa named by Lionel de Nicéville